21st Amendment Brewery is a brewery located in San Leandro, California. Their original location is a brewpub and restaurant in the South Park neighborhood of San Francisco, California, two blocks from Oracle Park. The brewery's name refers to the 21st Amendment to the U.S. Constitution, which repealed Prohibition.

History
The brewery was founded in August 2000 by Nico Freccia and Shaun O’Sullivan. The two had developed the idea for 21st Amendment brewery while attending a brewing class together at UC Davis. O’Sullivan had previously worked as an assistant brewer at Triple Rock Brewery & Alehouse in Berkeley, 20 Tank Brewery and Steelhead Brewing in San Francisco.

The San Francisco Business Times wrote that it "made a name for itself as a local brewery and restaurant where SoMa techies could lunch and Giants fans could gather before a game." It has been voted "Best Brewpub", "Best Burger" and "Best Happy Hour" by the San Francisco Press.

Prior to 2015, 21st Amendment's retail beers were canned in Cold Spring, Minnesota. In 2012, 21st Amendment planned to case 45,000 barrels of beer, up from 28,000 in 2011. In 2014, plans were announced to open a production facility and tasting room in San Leandro, California. The production brewery started brewing in 2015 and currently has capacity at 150,000 - 180,000 barrels. In 2018 the company was named by the Brewers Association the 26th largest craft brewery in the United States.

Beers
21st Amendment's slogan, "Celebrate the right to be original," is displayed on many of their cans, 6-pack and 4-pack carriers, posters, merchandise and website.

They brew and can several year-round beers including Brew Free! or Die IPA, Blood Orange Brew Free! or Die IPA, Blah Blah Blah Double IPA, El Sully Mexican-style Lager; seasonal beers including Hell or High Watermelon wheat, Tasty IPA, and Fireside Chat winter spiced ale; and limited-offering Insurrection Series beers. Historically, this included beers like Hop Crisis Imperial IPA, Monks Blood Belgian-style dark ale, Marooned on Hog Island oyster stout, and He Said Belgian Tripel/He Said Baltic Porter. They also offer a rotating assortment of beers that are available on tap only.

The 21st Amendment has also brewed a few of their brands at F.X. Matt in Utica, New York as part of their partnership with Brooklyn Brewery. The 21st Amendment also is part of a sales platform with Brooklyn Brewery and Funkwerks out of Fort Collins, Colorado.

Awards

See also
List of California breweries

References

External links

Drinking establishments in the San Francisco Bay Area
Beer brewing companies based in the San Francisco Bay Area
2000 establishments in California
Restaurants in San Francisco
South of Market, San Francisco
American companies established in 2000
Food and drink companies established in 2000
Restaurants established in 2000